Sheridan Andreas Mulholland Anderson (September 18, 1936 — March 31, 1984) was an American outdoorsman, fly fisherman, author, and illustrator.

Born near Los Angeles, Anderson moved with his parents and younger brother to Salt Lake City, where he attended the University of Utah and studied art. He dropped out and became involved in the rock climbing community, writing and drawing for various climbing publications and co-authoring books on the subject with Royal Robbins. In the 1980s Anderson lived in San Francisco and made ends meet as a sign painter.  He mixed his sign-making with his incredible wit and humor.

Anderson's most enduring reputation is for The Curtis Creek Manifesto, a 48-page illustrated guide to fly fishing named for a creek of the Blacksmith Fork River in Utah. Originally published in 1976 by Salmon Trout Steelheader, and later by Amato Publications.  This is Amato's best seller with roughly one million copies sold since its publication in 1978. Yvon Chouinard, a fellow outdoorsman who founded the Patagonia outdoor clothing company, called it "probably the best beginner's treatise on how to fly-fish."

References
 Reynolds, Christopher. "Trout savant in a big black cape". Los Angeles Times, April 20, 2004.
 Spence, Evelyn. "Master of the Manifesto". MidCurrent (fly fishing newsletter), 2004.

1936 births
1984 deaths
University of Utah alumni
American sportswriters
Angling writers
20th-century American non-fiction writers